Shahrak-e Shahid Beheshti (also Romanized as Shahrak-e Shahīd Beheshtī) is a village in Kheybar Rural District, Choghamish District, Dezful County, Khuzestan Province, Iran. At the 2006 census, its population was 2,728, in 495 families.

References 

Populated places in Dezful County